Club Athletic Youssoufia Berrechid, usually known simply as Youssoufia Berrechid, is a Moroccan football club based in Berrechid, Morocco. The club was founded in 1927 and their stadium is called the Stade Municipal de Berrechid. They currently play in Botola 2, the second level of Moroccan football.

Current squad

Achievements
Moroccan GNFA 1 Championship: 1
2005

Association football clubs established in 1927
Football clubs in Morocco
1927 establishments in Morocco
Sports clubs in Morocco